Williams, Indiana may refer to:

Williams, Adams County, Indiana, an unincorporated community in Root Township
Williams, Lawrence County, Indiana, an unincorporated census-designated place in Spice Valley Township